Leopold VI (15 October 1176 – 28 July 1230), known as Leopold the Glorious, was Duke of Styria from 1194 and Duke of Austria from 1198 to his death in 1230. He was a member of the House of Babenberg.

Biography 
Leopold VI was the younger son of Duke Leopold V and his wife, Helena of Hungary (daughter of Géza II of Hungary and Euphrosyne of Kiev). He was betrothed to the Damsel of Cyprus in 1193, but the marriage never took place.

In contravention of the provisions of the Georgenberg Pact, the Babenberg reign was divided after the death of Leopold V: Leopold VI's elder brother, Frederick I, was given the Duchy of Austria (corresponding roughly to modern Lower Austria and eastern Upper Austria), while Leopold VI himself became Duke of Styria. The duchies were reunified under Leopold VI when Frederick died after only four years of rule.

Leopold VI participated in the Reconquista in Spain and in two crusades, the Albigensian Crusade in 1212 and the failed Fifth Crusade from 1217 to 1221, and—like his predecessors—attempted to develop the land by founding monasteries. His most important foundation is Lilienfeld in the Lower Austrian valley of the Traisen River, where he was buried after his death. Besides that, he supported the then highly modern mendicant Orders of the Franciscans and Dominicans. He elevated Enns to the status of a city in 1212, and Vienna in 1221, the territory of which was nearly doubled.

Under Leopold's rule, the Gothic style began to reach Austria - the Cappella Speciosa in his temporary residence of Klosterneuburg is known as the first building influenced by it in the Danube area - a reconstruction of it can be seen today in the palace gardens of Laxenburg.

Leopold's court is known as a center of the Minnesang, e.g., Walther von der Vogelweide, Neidhart von Reuental and Ulrich von Liechtenstein were active here. Also, the Nibelungenlied may have been written in his court.

Babenbergian Austria reached the zenith of its prestige under Leopold's rule. Evidence of this is given by his marriage to the Byzantine princess Theodora Angelina and his attempt to end the War of the Keys by mediating between Holy Roman Emperor Frederick II and Pope Gregory IX. This is what he was working on when he died in 1230 at San Germano.

Children
Leopold and Theodora Angelina had:
 Margaret, Duchess of Austria (1204 – 29 October 1266), married Henry, eldest son and heir presumptive of the Holy Roman Emperor Frederick II, then after he died, married King Ottokar II of Bohemia.
 Agnes of Austria (19 February 1205 – 29 August 1226), married Albert I, Duke of Saxony
 Leopold of Austria (1207–1216) died when he climbed a tree and fell at Klosterneuburg
 Henry II, Duke of Mödling (1208 – 28 November 1228), married Agnes of Thuringia; their only daughter, Gertrudis, was the general heiress of the House of Babenberg after the death of her uncle
 Gertrude of Austria (1210–1241), married Henry Raspe, Landgrave of Thuringia
 Frederick II, Duke of Austria (25 April 1211 – 15 June 1246)
 Constantia of Austria (6 April 1212 – 5 June 1243), married Henry III, Margrave of Meissen

See also
 List of rulers of Austria
 List of Marshals of Austria

References

Sources

External links

 Leopold VI., Herzog at AEIOU

|-

Leopold VI of Austria
Leopold VI of Austria
13th-century dukes of Austria
Leopold 6
Leopold 6
Christians of the Fifth Crusade
People of the Albigensian Crusade